Thejaswini is a 1962 Indian Kannada-language film, directed by H. L. N. Simha and produced by Pandari Bai. The film stars Rajkumar, Pandari Bai, Rajashankar and Rajasree. The film had musical score by M. Venkataraju. The movie is based on the short story Holathi Kote by Govinda Murthy Desai which was published in the monthly magazine Karmaveera.

Cast

Rajkumar
Pandari Bai
Rajashankar
Rajasree
Narasimharaju
M. N. Lakshmidevi
Ramachandra Shastry
Chindodi Leela
Hanumanthachar
Adavani Lakshmidevi
Ganapathi Bhat
B. Ramadevi
Suryakumar
Papamma
H. A. Narasimhan
Nagarathnamma
Maheshwaraiah
Sharadamma
Dikki Madhavarao in Guest appearance
T. N. Balakrishna in Guest appearance
K. S. Ashwath in Guest appearance
S. N. Lakshmi in Guest appearance

References

External links
 
 

1962 films
1960s Kannada-language films
Films based on Indian novels
Films directed by H. L. N. Simha